Ahmanson may refer to:

People with the surname
Caroline Leonetti Ahmanson (1918–2005), American fashion consultant, businesswoman and philanthropist
Howard Ahmanson, Jr. (born 1950), American philanthropist and writer
Howard F. Ahmanson, Sr. (1906–1968), American businessman and philanthropist
Robert H. Ahmanson (circa 1937–2007), American businessman and philanthropist
William H. Ahmanson (1925-2008), American chief executive, philatelist and philanthropist

Places
Ahmanson Ranch, now known as the Upper Las Virgenes Canyon Open Space Preserve
Ahmanson Theatre, theatre in Los Angeles, California

Other
H. F. Ahmanson & Co., defunct American financial services company
Ahmanson's sportive lemur, a lemur from Madagascar